BVL may refer to

Lima Stock Exchange (Bolsa de Valores de Lima)
League of Free Liberals (Bond van Vrije Liberalen)
Belarusian Extraleague (Belarusian Vysshaya Liga)
BV Lüttringhausen, football club which merged with VfB Marathon Remscheid to form FC Remscheid
German Federal Office of Consumer Protection and Food Safety (Bundesamt für Verbraucherschutz und Lebensmittelsicherheit)
Buenaventura Lakes, Florida